Quantum cognition is an emerging field which applies the mathematical formalism of quantum theory to model cognitive phenomena such as information processing by the human brain, language, decision making, human memory, concepts and conceptual reasoning, human judgment, and perception. The field clearly distinguishes itself from the quantum mind as it is not reliant on the hypothesis that there is something micro-physical quantum-mechanical about the brain. Quantum cognition is based on the quantum-like paradigm or generalized quantum paradigm or quantum structure paradigm that information processing by complex systems such as the brain, taking into account contextual dependence of information and probabilistic reasoning, can be mathematically described in the framework of quantum information and quantum probability theory.

Quantum cognition uses the mathematical formalism of quantum theory to inspire and formalize models of cognition that aim to be an advance over models based on probability theory. The field focuses on modeling phenomena in cognitive science that have resisted traditional techniques or where traditional models seem to have reached a barrier (e.g., human memory), and modeling preferences in decision theory that seem paradoxical from a traditional rational point of view (e.g., preference reversals). Since the use of a quantum-theoretic framework is for modeling purposes, the identification of quantum structures in cognitive phenomena does not presuppose the existence of microscopic quantum processes in the human brain.

Main subjects of research

Quantum-like models of information processing ("quantum-like brain")
The brain is definitely a macroscopic physical system operating on scales of time, space and temperature that -- from the mainstream view -- differs crucially from the corresponding quantum scales. Macroscopic quantum-physical phenomena, such as the Bose-Einstein condensate, are also characterized by special conditions that are definitely not fulfilled in the brain. In particular, the brain's temperature is simply too high to be able to perform real quantum information processing, i.e., to use quantum carriers of information such as photons, ions or electrons. As is commonly accepted in brain science, the basic unit of information processing is a neuron. It is clear that a neuron cannot be in the superposition of two states: firing and non-firing. Hence, it cannot produce superposition playing the basic role in the quantum information processing. Superpositions of mental states are created by complex networks of neurons (classical neural networks). The quantum cognition community states that the activity of such neural networks can produce effects formally described as interference (of probabilities) and entanglement. In principle, however, the community does not try to create concrete models of "quantum-like" representation of information in the brain.

The quantum cognition project is based on the observation that various cognitive phenomena are more adequately described by quantum information theory and quantum probability than by the corresponding classical theories (see examples below). Thus, the quantum formalism is considered an operational formalism that describes non-classical processing of probabilistic data. Recent derivations of the complete quantum formalism from simple operational principles for representation of information support the foundations of quantum cognition.

Although, at the moment, we cannot present the concrete neurophysiological mechanisms of creation of the quantum-like representation of information in the brain, we can present general informational considerations supporting the idea that information processing in the brain matches with quantum information and probability. Here, contextuality is the key word (see the monograph of Khrennikov for detailed representation of this viewpoint). Quantum mechanics is fundamentally contextual. Quantum systems do not have objective properties which can be defined independently of measurement context. As has been pointed out by Niels Bohr, the whole experimental arrangement must be taken into account. Contextuality implies existence of incompatible mental variables, violation of the classical law of total probability, and constructive or destructive interference effects. Thus, the quantum cognition approach can be considered an attempt to formalize contextuality of mental processes, by using the mathematical apparatus of quantum mechanics.

Decision making
Suppose a person is given an opportunity to play two rounds of the following gamble: a coin toss will determine whether the subject wins $200 or loses $100. Suppose the subject has decided to play the first round, and does so. Some subjects are then given the result (win or lose) of the first round, while other subjects are not yet given any information about the results. The experimenter then asks whether the subject wishes to play the second round. Performing this experiment with real subjects gives the following results:

 When subjects believe they won the first round, the majority of subjects choose to play again on the second round.
 When subjects believe they lost the first round, the majority of subjects choose to play again on the second round.

Given these two separate choices, according to the sure thing principle of rational decision theory, they should also play the second round even if they don't know or think about the outcome of the first round. 
But, experimentally, when subjects are not told the results of the first round, the majority of them decline to play a second round.
This finding violates the law of total probability, yet it can be explained as a quantum interference effect in a manner similar to the explanation for the results from double-slit experiment in quantum physics. Similar violations of the sure-thing principle are seen in empirical studies of the Prisoner's Dilemma and have likewise been modeled in terms of quantum interference.

The above deviations from classical rational expectations in agents’ decisions under uncertainty produce well known paradoxes in behavioral economics, that is, the Allais, Ellsberg and Machina paradoxes. These deviations can be explained if one assumes that the overall conceptual landscape influences the subject's choice in a neither predictable nor controllable way. A decision process is thus an intrinsically contextual process, hence it cannot be modeled in a single Kolmogorovian probability space, which justifies the employment of quantum probability models in decision theory. More explicitly, the paradoxical situations above can be represented in a unified Hilbert space formalism where human behavior under uncertainty is explained in terms of genuine quantum aspects, namely, superposition, interference, contextuality and incompatibility.

Considering automated decision making, quantum decision trees have different structure compared to classical decision trees. Data can be analyzed to see if a quantum decision tree model fits the data better.

Human probability judgments
Quantum probability provides a new way to explain human probability judgment errors including the conjunction and disjunction errors. A conjunction error occurs when a person judges the probability of a likely event L and an unlikely event U to be greater than the unlikely event U; a disjunction error occurs when a person judges the probability of a likely event L to be greater than the probability of the likely event L or an unlikely event U. Quantum probability theory is a generalization of Bayesian probability theory because it is based on a set of von Neumann axioms that relax some of the classic Kolmogorov axioms. The quantum model introduces a new fundamental concept to cognition—the compatibility versus incompatibility of questions and the effect this can have on the sequential order of judgments. Quantum probability provides a simple account of conjunction and disjunction errors as well as many other findings such as order effects on probability judgments.

The liar paradox - The contextual influence of a human subject on the truth behavior of a cognitive entity is explicitly exhibited by the so-called liar paradox, that is, the truth value of a sentence like "this sentence is false". One can show that the true-false state of this paradox is represented in a complex Hilbert space, while the typical oscillations between true and false are dynamically described by the Schrödinger equation.

Knowledge representation
Concepts are basic cognitive phenomena, which provide the content for inference, explanation, and language understanding. Cognitive psychology has researched different approaches for understanding concepts including exemplars, prototypes, and neural networks, and different fundamental problems have been identified, such as the experimentally tested non classical behavior for the conjunction and disjunction of concepts, more specifically the Pet-Fish problem or guppy effect, and the overextension and underextension of typicality and membership weight for conjunction and disjunction. By and large, quantum cognition has drawn on quantum theory in three ways to model concepts.
 Exploit the contextuality of quantum theory to account for the contextuality of concepts in cognition and language and the phenomenon of emergent properties when concepts combine
 Use quantum entanglement to model the semantics of concept combinations in a non-decompositional way, and to account for the emergent properties/associates/inferences in relation to concept combinations
Use quantum superposition to account for the emergence of a new concept when concepts are combined, and as a consequence put forward an explanatory model for the Pet-Fish problem situation, and the overextension and underextension of membership weights for the conjunction and disjunction of concepts.

The large amount of data collected by Hampton on the combination of two concepts can be modeled in a specific quantum-theoretic framework in Fock space where the observed deviations from classical set (fuzzy set) theory, the above-mentioned over- and under- extension of membership weights, are explained in terms of contextual interactions, superposition, interference, entanglement and emergence. And, more, a cognitive test on a specific concept combination has been performed which directly reveals, through the violation of Bell's inequalities, quantum entanglement between the component concepts.

Semantic analysis and information retrieval
The research in (iv) had a deep impact on the understanding and initial development of a formalism to obtain semantic information when dealing with concepts, their combinations and variable contexts in a corpus of unstructured documents. This conundrum of natural language processing (NLP) and information retrieval (IR) on the web – and data bases in general – can be addressed using the mathematical formalism of quantum theory. As basic steps, (a) K. Van Rijsbergen introduced a quantum structure approach to IR, (b) Widdows and Peters utilised a quantum logical negation for a concrete search system, and Aerts and Czachor identified quantum structure in semantic space theories, such as latent semantic analysis. Since then, the employment of techniques and procedures induced from the mathematical formalisms of quantum theory – Hilbert space, quantum logic and probability, non-commutative algebras, etc. – in fields such as IR and NLP, has produced significant results.

Gestalt perception

There are apparent similarities between Gestalt perception and quantum theory. In an article discussing the application of Gestalt to chemistry, Anton Amann writes: "Quantum mechanics does not explain Gestalt perception, of course, but in quantum mechanics and Gestalt psychology there exist almost isomorphic conceptions and problems:

Similarly as with the Gestalt concept, the shape of a quantum object does not a priori exist but it depends on the interaction of this quantum object with the environment (for example: an observer or a measurement apparatus).
Quantum mechanics and Gestalt perception are organized in a holistic way. Subentities do not necessarily exist in a distinct, individual sense.
In quantum mechanics and Gestalt perception objects have to be created by elimination of holistic correlations with the 'rest of the world'."

Each of the points mentioned in the above text in a simplified manner (Below explanations correlate respectively with the above-mentioned points):

 As an object in quantum physics  doesn't have any shape until and unless it interacts with its environment; Objects according to Gestalt perspective do not hold much of a meaning individually as they do when there is a "group" of them or when they are present in an environment.
 Both in quantum mechanics and Gestalt perception, the objects must be studied as a whole rather than finding properties of individual components and interpolating the whole object.
 In Gestalt concept creation of a new object from another previously existing object means that the previously existing object now becomes a sub entity of the new object, and hence "elimination of holistic correlations" occurs. Similarly a new quantum object made from a previously existing object means that the previously existing object loses its holistic view.

Amann comments: "The structural similarities between Gestalt perception and quantum mechanics are on a level of a parable, but even parables can teach us something, for example, that quantum mechanics is more than just production of numerical results or that the Gestalt concept is more than just a silly idea, incompatible with atomistic conceptions."

History
Ideas for applying the formalisms of quantum theory to cognition first appeared in the 1990s by Diederik Aerts and his collaborators Jan Broekaert, Sonja Smets and Liane Gabora, by Harald Atmanspacher, Robert Bordley, and Andrei Khrennikov. A special issue on Quantum Cognition and Decision appeared in the Journal of Mathematical Psychology (2009, vol 53.), which planted a flag for the field. A few books related to quantum cognition have been published including those by Khrennikov (2004, 2010), Ivancivic and Ivancivic (2010), Busemeyer and Bruza (2012), E. Conte (2012). The first Quantum Interaction workshop was held at Stanford in 2007 organized by Peter Bruza, William Lawless, C. J. van Rijsbergen, and Don Sofge as part of the 2007 AAAI Spring Symposium Series. This was followed by workshops at Oxford in 2008, Saarbrücken in 2009, at the 2010 AAAI Fall Symposium Series held in Washington, D.C., 2011 in Aberdeen, 2012 in Paris, and 2013 in Leicester. Tutorials also were presented annually beginning in 2007 until 2013 at the annual meeting of the Cognitive Science Society. A Special Issue on Quantum models of Cognition appeared in 2013 in the journal Topics in Cognitive Science.

See also

Bayesian approaches to brain function
Electromagnetic theories of consciousness
Holonomic brain theory
Quantum Bayesianism
Quantum logic
Quantum neural network
NeuroQuantology
Orchestrated objective reduction

References

Further reading

External links
 
 

Quantum information theory
Cognitive modeling
Cognitive science
Decision theory
Quantum mind